Megalodon is a 2004 American horror film. It takes place out on a deep-sea oil rig. When a deep sea drilling platform penetrates the sea bed in Greenland, it unleashes a prehistoric shark of enormous power and proportions known as megalodon. It is known in the UK and other territories as Sharkzilla.

Plot
In the North Atlantic off the coast of Greenland, a highly advanced deep sea oil rig has been recently constructed by the company Nexecon Petroleum, and named "Colossus" for its immense size. This "new" type of oil rig can dig deeper and extract more oil than any other in the world. The fact that this huge rig has been built on fault lines alarms geologists, who are concerned that the delicate ocean floor fault lines in that region might be disturbed through deep drilling, with catastrophic consequences. A reporter, Christen Giddings, has been invited by the CEO of Nexecon, Peter Brazier, to the oil rig in an attempt to address the concerns of the geologists. Christen is accompanied by a trusted cameraman Jake Thompson, who will record their findings. The oil rig's crew seem to be convinced that nothing bad will happen, and are skeptical of the geologists.

Brazier hopes that a documented report on "Colossus" will reveal that his rig has all the necessary safety arrangements and that the region is stable enough for a drilling operation. As the drilling commences, a rich oil deposit is discovered. However, further drilling is not stopped and an "ocean floor fault line" gets ruptured, which opens a portal to a "mirror" ocean, hidden under the normal ocean for millions of years and containing prehistoric life. An explosion occurs and the drilling system collapses. A team of engineers descend through a glass elevator to assess the situation. A giant animal is spotted approaching, which turns out to be the most powerful and fearsome oceanic predator that ever lived, Carcharodon megalodon, a giant,  prehistoric shark.

A struggle for survival ensues as the crew and geologists attempt to escape from "Colossus", during which several people fall victim to the beast. In a desperate move to stop the monster shark, one of the crew members, Ross, lures it to an open space with his small submarine and overloads the fuel tanks of the machine, resulting in a gigantic explosion that kills both him and the beast. The ordeal is not over yet as another megalodon ventures into open waters, passing below a boat with Christen Giddings on board. However, she is unaware of its presence.

Cast
 Leighanne Littrell as Christen Giddings
 Al Sapienza as Ross Elliot
 Robin Sachs as Peter Brazier
 Jennifer Sommerfield as Amanda "Maz" Zablenko
 Fred Belford as Jack Thompson
 Evan Mirand as R.P. McGinnis
 Mark Sheppard as Mitchell Parks
 Steve Scionti as David Collen

Releases
The film was released in Japan during October 2002, and in the United States during February 2004.

See also
 Megalodon
 Meg: A Novel of Deep Terror
 Mega Shark Versus Giant Octopus
 Shark Attack 3

External links 
 

2002 films
2002 horror films
American natural horror films
2000s monster movies
Giant monster films
Films about sharks
Films about shark attacks
American monster movies
2000s English-language films
2000s American films